is a Japanese football player for Consadole Sapporo, currently playing in the J1 League.

Career statistics

Club

References

External links
Profile at Nagoya Grampus

1996 births
Living people
Association football people from Tokyo
Japanese footballers
J1 League players
J2 League players
J3 League players
Nagoya Grampus players
J.League U-22 Selection players
Omiya Ardija players
Hokkaido Consadole Sapporo players
Association football midfielders